Yemi Osunkoya (born 1966) is a New York-based Nigerian fashion designer and the founder and creative director of Kosibah Creations - a couture bridal and eveningwear fashion brand. His haute couture brand, "Kosibah" label was named after his mother's name "Cosiba", which, in the Republic of Benin, represents the "day name" of a female child born on a Sunday. His company Kosibah Creations designs luxury bridal gowns and evening wears for high-value women across the UK, Nigeria, South Africa, US and Caribbean.

Early life and education 
Osunkoya was born in Ibadan, Oyo State of Nigeria and attended International School, Ibadan from 1977 to 1982 before proceeding to study at the Obafemi Awolowo University where he graduated with BA in Fine Arts and Textile Design in 1987. He then migrated to the United Kingdom and completed fashion diploma at the Paris Academy School of Fashion, London.

Career 
After graduating from a private London fashion school called the "Paris Academy School of Fashion", which is now closed, where he learned how to design, cut and sew both womenwear and menwear, Osunkoya launched his fashion company "Kosibah Creations" in London in 1991. His Kosibah bridal brand features in many high end bridal salons and fashion shows across the globe and has many celebrated clients like Diane Abbott; singer & TV personality Alesha Dixon; Janet Boateng the wife of Paul Boateng actress Louise Rose; singer Stephanie Benson; Miss World Agbani Darego; Hollywood actress Indra Ove as well as Kelly Rowland; Sheila Ferguson of The Three Degrees; actress Helen Fraser of ITV's Bad Girls and Angela Griffin of BBC's Babyfather. In 2016, Osunkoya relocated to New York City where he now runs his US based Kosibah bridal salon but he still visits his London base quite often. He recently signed partnership deal with Mark Ingram Atelier of the Manhattan-based bridal salon known for upscale and sophisticated bridal designs where he also revealed his 2020 Kosibah bridal collections during the Wedding Weekend at Madison Avenue, New York.

Philanthropy 
At the beginning of the COVID-19 pandemic, Osunkoya partnered with Kelly Hall-Tompkins, the founder of Music Kichen (a charity organisation that offers classical music to homeless shelters), to sew face-masks and donate them for the homeless shelters that Music Kichen works with.
He is a member of the Bridal Council and the first person of colour to join this New York-based non-profit organisation that supports bridal-focused designers, retailers and media.

Awards and recognition 
In 2017, he was listed among the Top 10 Bridal Designers in Nigeria by the City People Magazine. He also received the "Pride Of Africa" Award in 2014 at the 'Africa Fashion Week Barcelona' (AFWB) in Barcelona, Spain. He also received the 2012 International Designer of the Year by the City People Magazine; the Excellence Award at the Gathering of Africa's Best in 2006; the Diamond recognition in the 2005 National Weddings show; the Bridal Designer of the Year at the Mahogany Bridal Awards in 2002 and 2004; and also received the Highly Commended designation from the National Weddings show in 2002.

References 

Nigerian fashion designers
1969 births
Living people
People from Ibadan
Obafemi Awolowo University alumni
Nigerian emigrants to the United Kingdom
Nigerian expatriates in the United States